Lyromma is a genus of foliicolous (leaf-dwelling) lichens, and the sole member of Lyrommataceae, a family in the order Chaetothyriales. The genus was circumscribed in 1965 by Brazilian mycologists Augusto Chaves Batista and Heraldo da Silva Maia, with Lyromma nectandrae assigned as the type species. The family was proposed by Robert Lücking in 2008. Characteristics of the genus include the spherical to short barrel-shaped perithecia and elongated barrel-shaped pycnidia, and smooth thalli (lacking a cortex) of rounded patches formed by its symbiotic relationship with green algae from the genus Phycopeltis.

Species
Lyromma confusum  – Neotropics
Lyromma coronatum  – Bolivia
Lyromma dolicobelum 
Lyromma multisetulatum  – Bolivia; Brazil
Lyromma nectandrae 
Lyromma ornatum  – Neotropics
Lyromma palmae 
Lyromma pilosum  – South America

References

Eurotiomycetes
Eurotiomycetes genera
Lichen genera
Taxa described in 1965